Jordan Evans (born October 25, 1987 in Chester, Virginia) is an American soccer player who most recently played for Richmond Kickers in the USL Second Division.

Career

Youth and College
Evans attended Thomas Dale High School, where he was his team's captain and was named to the All-state, All-Richmond Metro, All-region and All-district first teams as a junior, and to the All-state first-team as a senior. He played two seasons at the University of Richmond, where he was named to the Atlantic 10 Tournament's All-Championship Team as a freshman in 2006, before transferring to the University of Virginia prior to his junior season. In his senior year, UVA captured the ACC Men's Soccer Championship where Evans was named MVP in the final against N.C. State.  The Cavaliers continued their run to win the 2009 NCAA National Championship over Akron.

During his college years Evans also played for Richmond Kickers Future and the Fredericksburg Gunners in the USL Premier Development League.

Professional
Evans turned professional in 2010 when he signed with the Richmond Kickers of the USL PRO. He made his professional debut on May 1, 2010 in a league match against the Real Maryland Monarchs.

Honors

University of Virginia
NCAA Men's Division I Soccer Championship (1): 2009

References

External links
 Virginia bio
 Richmond bio

1987 births
Living people
American soccer players
Richmond Spiders men's soccer players
Virginia Cavaliers men's soccer players
Richmond Kickers Future players
Fredericksburg Gunners players
Richmond Kickers players
USL League Two players
USL Second Division players
Soccer players from Richmond, Virginia
People from Chester, Virginia
Association football forwards